Haydon Cameron Roberts (born 10 May 2002) is an English professional footballer who plays as a left back for  club Derby County, on loan from Brighton & Hove Albion of the Premier League.

Club career

Brighton & Hove Albion
Roberts made his professional and first team debut for Brighton & Hove Albion, whose academy he had progressed from, on 25 September 2019 in the EFL Cup at home against Aston Villa where he scored Brighton's only goal in a 3–1 defeat. 

His next appearance for The Seagulls came almost a year later, on 17 September 2020. This appearance again came in the EFL Cup, this time coming on as a substitute in the 4–0 home victory over Portsmouth.

Rochdale (loan)

Roberts signed a season long loan deal with League One side Rochdale on 16 October 2020. He made his debut for The Dale four days later in which was also his professional league debut, playing the full match and helping keep a clean sheet in the 1–0 away win over Burton Albion. Roberts made 25 appearances in the league and in all competitions for The Dale finishing in 21st place, thus being relegated from the third tier.

Return to the Albion

He made his first appearance in the 2021–22 season on 24 August, in the EFL Cup second round fixture away at Cardiff City where he helped keep a clean sheet in the 2–0 victory. He featured in a Premier League matchday squad for the first time on 11 September, remaining as an unused substitute in the 1–0 away win over Brentford.

Derby (loan)
On 9 July 2022, Roberts joined EFL League One club Derby County on loan for the  2022–23 season. He scored his first goal for Derby and first ever in a league game on 12 November, heading home from a Conor Hourihane corner in the 3–1 away win over MK Dons. For reward for scoring the goal, Roberts' bizarrely received a mug by head coach Paul Warne.

International career
Roberts was included in the England squad for the 2019 UEFA European Under-17 Championship.

Career statistics

References

2002 births
Living people
English footballers
Association football defenders
Brighton & Hove Albion F.C. players
Rochdale A.F.C. players
Derby County F.C. players
England youth international footballers